Printing and the Mind of Man is a book first published in 1967 and based on an exhibition in 1963.

PMM, as it is usually abbreviated, is regarded as a standard bibliographical reference, and offers a survey of the impact of printed books on the development of western civilization. The book developed from an exhibition put on at two locations to coincide with the 1963 International Printing Machinery and Allied Trades Exhibition (IPEX). At the behest of typographer Stanley Morison it was decided to put together an exhibition of the contribution printing had made to the enlargement of human knowledge. A display at Earls Court concentrated on the technical side of printing, while a display at the British Museum looked more at fine printing. However, both displays had the quite novel intention of promoting the study of books for their role in advancing factual knowledge, rather than for their aesthetics. Ian Fleming, who lent 40 books from his library, was among the private collectors who contributed to the exhibition. The Fleming Collection so central to the exhibit is now at Indiana University.

The catalogue, (which might be considered the pre-first edition of PMM) was printed by Oxford University Press, edited by John Carter, Stanley Morison, Percy H. Muir and others and entitled: Catalogue of a display of printing mechanisms and printed materials arranged to illustrate the history of Western civilization and the means of the multiplication of literary texts since the 15th century, organised in connection with the eleventh International Printing Machinery and Allied Trades Exhibition, under the title Printing and the Mind of Man, assembled at the British Museum and at Earls Court, London, 16–27 July 1963.

A book-length edition, revised and enlarged, was printed at Cambridge University Press and published in 1967 by Cassell in London and Holt, Rinehart & Winston in New York. This first book edition was entitled Printing and the Mind of Man, a descriptive catalogue illustrating the impact of print on the evolution of Western civilization during five centuries. It was edited by John Carter and Percy H. Muir and expanded upon the theme of the impact of printing on human thought.

A second revised edition was published in 1983 by Karl Pressler in Munich.

References

Further reading
 Sebastian Carter - "Printing and the mind of man" in Matrix Volume 20 (2000)

1963 non-fiction books
1967 non-fiction books
20th-century history books
Books about printing
Bibliography
1983 non-fiction books